Murphey is an unincorporated community in Duplin County, North Carolina, United States, on NC 11, east of I-40, at an elevation of 46 ft.

References

Unincorporated communities in Duplin County, North Carolina
Unincorporated communities in North Carolina